"The Great Snake" or "The Great Serpent"  (lit. "Of the Great Serpent") is a folk tale (the so-called skaz) of the Ural region of Siberia collected and reworked by Pavel Bazhov. It was first published in the 11th issue of the Krasnaya Nov literary magazine in 1936 and later the same year as a part of the collection Prerevolutionary Folklore of the Urals. It was later released as a part of The Malachite Casket collection. The story was translated from Russian into English by Alan Moray Williams in 1944, and by Eve Manning in the 1950s.

In this skaz, two boys meet the legendary creature the Great Snake (also translated as Poloz the Great Snake).

The story of two brothers is then continued in "The Snake Trail", published in 1939.

Publication 
This skaz was first published together with "The Mistress of the Copper Mountain" and "Beloved Name" (also known as "That Dear Name") in the 11th issue of Krasnaya Nov in 1936. "Beloved Name" was published on the pages 5–9, "The Great Snake" on pp. 9–12, and "The Mistress of the Copper Mountain" on pp. 12–17. These tales are the ones that follow the original Ural miners' folklore most closely. They were included in the collection Prerevolutionary Folklore of the Urals, released later the same year by Sverdlovsk Publishing House. It was later released as a part of The Malachite Casket collection on 28 January 1939.

In 1944 the story was translated from Russian into English by Alan Moray Williams and published by Hutchinson as a part of The Malachite Casket: Tales from the Urals collection. The title was translated as "The Great Snake". In the 1950s another translation of The Malachite Casket was made by Eve Manning The story was published as "The Great Serpent".

Sources 
Poloz is the word for the snakes from the Colubridae family.  The character of Poloz the Great Snake is based the Ural legends, miner's omens, and on the superstitions of the Khanty, the Mansi people, and the Bashkirs. The legends about Poloz, a giant serpent 6–10 meters long, still exist at the Urals. In the Bashkir folklore there is the character the Master of Gold, which can appear as various animals, including the snake. At the Urals he is also called The Serpent or The Snake King (Змеиный царь, Zmeinyj tsar). It is believed that the grass turns yellow where he touches the surface. Poloz and the snake trails in general indicate the location of gold. Slowworms are his servants.

Geographically, the folk tales came from the old Sysert Mining District, which included five mining plants, i. e. the Sysert Plant (Sysertsky or Sysertsky Zavod), the head plant of the district, Polevskoy (also known as Polevaya or Poleva), Seversky, Verkhny (Verkh-Sysertsky), and Ilyinsky (Nizhve-Sysertsky). The appearances of Poloz were often connected with the Polevskoy plant.

Bazhov also introduced numerous daughters of the Snake, including Golden Hair from the tale of the same name. The relationship between him and another folklore creature, The Mistress of the Copper Mountain, is unclear. Bazhov noted that none of the people that he talked to seemed to know it. Bazhov believed that the most ancient creature of the Ural mythology is Azov Girl, the Snake appeared next, and the last one was the Mistress. It is further proved by the fact that Poloz is a zoomorphic being, as he probably comes from the era of totemistic beliefs.

Plot 
In this skaz, the old miner Levonty, a weak and ill man who spent all his life mining, decides to try gold digging to make ends meet. He can hardly work, and his family is very poor. One day he goes to the mine with his two little sons as usual. In the evening he goes to the river to fish. While the boys are waiting for Levonty, they are approached by a soldier Semyonich, a strange man who "had a lot of books" and "every evening he'd sit reading them". Semyonich has a certain reputation among the workers for having money seemingly out of nowhere. He feeds the children some bread and learns about a dire situation in their house. He promises to help them, but warns to keep it secret. Semyonich goes off and comes back with a green-eyed man.

He was all yellow, is tunic and trousers were gold, that brocade the priests wear, and his wide girdle with a pattern and tassels hanging, from it was brocade too, only it shone greenish. His cap was yellow with red flaps on both sides, and his boots were gold too. [...] And his eyes were green, like a cat's. But they had a kind look. He was the same height as Semyonich and not stout, but heavy. The earth sank under him where he stood.

The person's face is yellow too. "But what if we spoil these boys?", he asks Semyonich kindly. Semyonich defends the boys as humble, hard-working and not greedy. The man consents to his judgement, stating that he knows their father will not live long. He then tells the children to "watch for the trail" and dig along it. The man transforms into a giant serpent, and moves away leaving the trail behind. Semyonich explains that the man is Poloz the Great Snake (alternative translation: The Great Serpent), the lord of all that is gold. Next morning, the boys start digging for gold and quickly find two gold nuggets. story over.

Analysis 
Bazhov's Poloz, in addition to his traditional function of a treasure guardian, also fulfils the concept of social justice. He rewards the worthy and is dangerous to everyone else, especially to those who starts quarrels because of gold. His gifts are not supposed to be shared.

In Bazhov's tales, his constant opponent is the wise eagle-owl.

Semyonich is a classical Bazhov's character. On the one hand, he is a truth seeker who is in contact with magical beings, on the other hand, he is an outsider, who is not accepted in the society.

Denis Zherdev compared Poloz and the Mistress of the Copper Mountain, pointing out the male domain of Poloz is the world of order, structure, and hierarchy, and the power over gold is associated with the power of men. Unlike the Mistress, his appearance does not bring in unpredictability and destruction.

Adaptations 
The Soviet playwright Klavdiya Filippova combined "The Great Snake" and "The Snake Trail" to create Poloz's Daughter. The play was published in the 1949 collection Plays for Children's Theatre Based on Bazhov's Stories in Sverdlovsk.

A 2007 Russian film The Golden Snake is loosely based on "The Great Snake".

Notes

References 
 
 
 
 
 

1936 short stories
Bashkir folklore
Children's short stories
Fantasy short stories
Fictional characters with earth or stone abilities
Legendary serpents
Male characters in fairy tales
Russian fairy tales
Russian folklore characters
Slavic legendary creatures
The Malachite Box short stories
Ugrian mythology
Pavel Bazhov